Salen  may refer to:

Places
Salen, Ardnamurchan, a village on the Ardnamurchan peninsula in the highland region of Scotland.
Salen, Mull, a village on the island of Mull in the Inner Hebrides of Scotland
Sälen, in Dalarna, Sweden

Other uses
 Salen ligand, a type of chemical compound used in chemistry
 Salen Kotch, main antagonist in Call of Duty: Infinite Warfare

See also
 Salem (disambiguation)